Patxi's (pronounced pah-cheese) is a small pizzeria chain based in Sausalito, California.

History 
Patxi's was founded by William Freeman and Francisco “Patxi” Azpiroz.  The restaurant chain specializes in Chicago-style pizza. 

In April 2014, it was announced that the private-equity firm KarpReilly LLC acquired a controlling interest in the company. The announcement also stated that co-founder William Freeman would continue as the company's CEO, and that the company aimed to expand to 70 Patxi's locations by 2019.

On September 24, 2018, it was announced that Patxi's is being acquired by Elite Restaurant Group. Terms of the deal were not disclosed.

As of 2019, the firm has 12 restaurant locations in San Francisco Bay Area. In addition, the firm has locations in Seattle, Denver, and Los Angeles.

In popular culture 
On November 6, 2015, Patxi's partnered with UberEATS to offer $10.00 cheese pizzas that were delivered in a box that said "Little Nero's" to honor the twenty-fifth anniversary of the release of the comedy film Home Alone.

Critical reception
The pizzeria has received positive reviews from several sources.

References

External links

Pizza chains of the United States
Restaurants in San Francisco
Restaurants in the San Francisco Bay Area
2004 establishments in California
Basque-American culture in California
Sausalito, California
Restaurants established in 2004